The Bishop of Bradford was, until 20 April 2014, the ordinary of the Diocese of Bradford, which covered the extreme west of Yorkshire and was centred in the city of Bradford where the bishop's seat (cathedra) is located in the Cathedral Church of Saint Peter. The bishop's residence was "Bishopscroft" in Bradford. The office existed since the foundation of the see from part of the Diocese of Ripon in 1920 under George V. The last diocesan Bishop of Bradford was Nick Baines, from 21 May 2011 until 20 April 2014. Baines was on sabbatical from February 2014 until the dissolution of the diocese on Easter Day 2014, during which time retired bishop Tom Butler was acting diocesan Bishop of Bradford.

List of bishops

Assistant bishops
Among those who have served as assistant bishops in the diocese were:
1935–1949: Rupert Mounsey CR, Canon of Bradford (from 1937) and former Bishop of Labuan and Sarawak (1909–1916) and Assistant in Wakefield (1924) and in Truro (1925–1935)
19481957 (ret.): Alec Hardy, Vicar of Gargrave and former Bishop in Nagpur
19881993 (res.): David Evans, Gen. Sec. of SAMS and former Bishop in Peru — acting diocesan bishop, 1991–1992
19982001 (ret.): Peter Vaughan, house-for-duty assistant bishop and retired Bishop suffragan of Ramsbury
20022008 (d.): Ian Harland, honorary assistant bishop, retired Bishop of Carlisle
20052014 (formation of Leeds dio.): David Hope, Hon. Priest-in-Charge, Ilkley (St Margaret's) until 2006, and former Archbishop of York

References

Bradford
Bishops of Bradford
Bishops diocesan of Bradford